Streptomyces olivoverticillatus is a bacterium species from the genus of Streptomyces which has been isolated from soil in Japan. Streptomyces olivoverticillatus produces trichomycin.

See also 
 List of Streptomyces species

References

Further reading

External links
Type strain of Streptomyces olivoverticillatus at BacDive -  the Bacterial Diversity Metadatabase

olivoverticillatus
Bacteria described in 1991